The restoration of Min Saw Mon was a military campaign led by the Bengal Sultanate to help Min Saw Mon regain control of his Launggyet Dynasty. The campaign was successful. Min Saw Mon was restored to the Launggyet throne, and northern Arakan became a vassal state of the Bengal Sultanate.

Background
In 1406, Burmese forces from the Kingdom of Ava invaded Arakan. The control of Arakan was part of the Forty Years' War between Ava and Hanthawaddy Pegu on the Burmese mainland. The control of Arakan would change hands a few times before Hanthawaddy forces drove out Ava forces in 1412. Ava would retain a toehold in northern Arakan until 1416/17 but did not try to retake Arakan. The Hanthawaddy influence ended after King Razadarit's death in 1421.

The former Arakanese ruler Min Saw Mon received asylum in the Bengal Sultanate and lived there for 24 years. Saw Mon became close to the Bengal Sultan Jalaluddin Muhammad Shah, serving as a commander in the king's army. Saw Mon convinced the sultan to help restore him to his lost throne.

Invasion
In 1429, Saw Mon aided by troops "largely made up of Afghan adventurers" invaded Arakan. The first attempt at the invasion failed because Saw Mon got into an argument with Gen. Wali Khan of Bengal, and was imprisoned by the general. Saw Mon escaped, and the sultan agreed to another attempt. The second invasion went well. Saw Mon was proclaimed king at Launggyet on 18 April 1429 (Thursday, 1st waning of Kason 791 ME).

Aftermath
Saw Mon later founded a new royal capital, Mrauk U. His kingdom would become known as the Mrauk U Kingdom. He died in 1433, and was succeeded by his younger brother Min Khayi.

The subordinate relationship with Bengal did not last long. Sultan Jalaluddin Muhammad Shah died in 1433, and was succeeded by a string of weak sultans. In 1437, Khayi took over the throne of Sandoway (Thandwe), unifying the Arakan coast, probably for the first time in history. He also married Saw Yin Mi, the queen of Sandoway. Then, Khayi occupied Ramu, the southernmost territory of his erstwhile overlord Bengal. The Arakanese chronicles say that Khayi successfully seized Chittagong in 1450. However, the first confirmed successful occupation of Chittagong came only nine years later in 1459 when King Ba Saw Phyu seized the port from Sultan Rukunuddin Barbak Shah.

Notes

References

Further reading
 
 
 
 
 
 

Conflicts in 1429
1429 in Asia
Military history of the Bengal Sultanate